Pitsiulartok or Pituilaktok (formerly Fairway Island) is a small, uninhabited island located at 63°15'N, 90°33'W in Hudson Bay, about 13 km from the community of Chesterfield Inlet, Nunavut, Canada. The narrow island is about 3.5 km in length and barely 1 km wide at its widest point. Traditionally it was a walrus-hunting ground for the local Inuit, and a landmark for southern whalers. It is part of a loose chain of small islands running along the coast, including Sakpik Island and Promise Island.

The name "Pituilaktok" comes from the Inuktitut name for a local bird known in English as the black guillemot (cepphus grylle), "pitiula".

References

Islands of Hudson Bay
Uninhabited islands of Kivalliq Region